Tatlayoko Lake is a lake on the Homathko River in the western Chilcotin District of the Central Interior of British Columbia, Canada, located on a north-south axis just upstream of the entrance of the series of canyons of the Homathko, including the Great Canyon of the Homathko, on its route to the sea at the head of Bute Inlet.  The community of Tatlayoko Lake, British Columbia is located at its northern end.

History
Tatlayoko Lake is part of the land claim of the Tsilhqot'in People of Xeni (aka Xeni Gwet'in First Nation or the Nemaia Valley Indian Band) and is called by them Talhiqox Biny ("biny"-"lake").  One of their number, Klattasine or Klatsassan, led a party of warriors to attack a crew building a gold-rush era route known as Waddington's Road in the Homathko's canyons, which was the opening round of the Chilcotin War of 1864.  Relief troops, including the governor of the colony's own party and escort, came to the Chilcotin via Tatlayoko Lake.

Tatlayoko Lake and the Homathko River are components in a proposed diversion project involving Chilko Lake, across the mountains on the east side of the lake.  Run-of-the-river hydroelectric licenses have been let for the Homathko downstream from the lake.

Etymology
The first comprehensive map of British Columbia was produced under the authority of Joseph Trutch, and was published in 1871. This map gives the name as Ta tlah co Lake, which is similar to the Tsilhqot'in name Telhiqox.  A few years later, George Dawson surveyed the geology of the area, and his 1878 report to the Geological Survey of Canada used the spelling Tatlayoco.  Maps of British Columbia published in the 1880s and 1890s continued to use minor variations of Tatlahco Lake, while many geological publications used Dawson's spelling of Tatlayoco.

The existence of many different spellings for a geographic location was not unusual for that era, and the Geographic Board of Canada was established in 1897 to standardize these spellings.  Their "Rules of Nomenclature" included the following:
 The name that is published first will be preferred
 If an indigenous name is used, the spelling should approximate the true pronunciation
 The name should not include any redundant or unpronounced letters
 Any hard "c" should be replaced with a "k"

The Geographic Board of Canada was unaware that the lake was named Tatlahco, which they erroneously thought was a name for a tributary to the Bella Coola River.  They were only aware of Dawson's spelling of Tatlayoco, which they adopted as the official name in 1911, after changing the hard "c" to a "k".  The name therefore came to be spelled Tatlayoko, despite the fact that Tatlahco was published first, is a better approximation of the original Tsilhqot'in word, and reflects the actual pronunciation of the name (TA-tla-ko).
According to the Rules of Nomenclature, Tatlahco should have been respelled Tatlako.

References

Lakes of the Chilcotin
Lakes of British Columbia
Pacific Ranges
Range 2 Coast Land District